Henry Philpott (17 November 1807 – 10 January 1892) was an Anglican bishop and academic.

He matriculated at St Catharine's College, Cambridge, in 1825 and graduated as Senior Wrangler and 2nd Smith's prizeman in 1829.  He was elected a Fellow of St Catharine's College on 6 April 1829 and was subsequently elected Master of St Catharine's College in 1845, a post he held until 1861. During the same period, he was Vice-Chancellor of the University of Cambridge on three occasions (1846, 1856, 1857).

Philpott was awarded the degree of Doctor of Divinity by royal letters patent in 1847 and was Bishop of Worcester from 1861 to 1890. His election to the see was confirmed on 13 March and he was consecrated a bishop on 25 March 1861. He was Clerk of the Closet from 1865 to 1891 and Chairman of the Cambridge University Commission in 1878.

References

1807 births
1892 deaths
Alumni of St Catharine's College, Cambridge
Senior Wranglers
Fellows of St Catharine's College, Cambridge
Masters of St Catharine's College, Cambridge
Vice-Chancellors of the University of Cambridge
Bishops of Worcester
Clerks of the Closet